First Harvest 1984–92 is a greatest-hits compilation by Alphaville.  Unlike the earlier 1988 compilation The Singles Collection which consists of two versions each of four different songs, First Harvest includes a wider selection of material.

The cassette version of First Harvest omits "Sensations," "Red Rose" and "Big in Japan" (Culture mix).

Track listing
 "Big in Japan" (Original 7" Version) – 3:54
 "Sounds Like a Melody" (1992 Remix) – 4:29
 "Sensations" (Original 7" Version) – 3:58
 "The Mysteries of Love" (Original 7" Mix) – 3:34
 "Lassie Come Home" (1992 Remix) – 6:58
 "Jerusalem" (Original 7" Version) – 3:35
 "Dance with Me" (1992 Remix) – 4:08
 "For a Million" (Original Album Version) – 6:09
 "A Victory of Love" (1992 Remix) – 4:13
 "Jet Set" (1992 Remix) – 3:40
 "Red Rose" (Original 7" Version) – 4:38
 "Romeos" (Album Edit) – 4:52
 "Summer Rain" (Original Album Version) – 4:10
 "Forever Young" (Original Album Version) – 3:45
 "Big in Japan" (1992 Culture Mix) – 6:08

 The "Culture Mix" of "Big in Japan" is identical to "The Mix Extended Version" from the "Big in Japan 1992 A.D." single release.

Charts

Sales and certifications

Notes
http://www.alphaville.de/main.htm, Alphaville Discography
http://music.barnesandnoble.com/First-Harvest-The-Best-of-Alphaville-1984-1992/Alphaville/e/090317645421 , All Music Guide

References

1992 greatest hits albums
Alphaville (band) albums